Richard Manuel Jauron (born October 7, 1950) is a former American football player and coach. He played eight seasons in the National Football League (NFL), five with the Detroit Lions and three with the Cincinnati Bengals. Jauron served as the head coach the Chicago Bears from 1999 to 2003 and the Buffalo Bills from 2006 until November 2009. He was also the interim head coach for the Lions for the final five games of the 2005 season. Jauron was named the AP Coach of the Year in 2001 after leading the Bears to a 13–3 record.

Jauron played college football at Yale University. He was inducted into the College Football Hall of Fame in 2015. Jauron was selected a NFF Scholar Athlete in 1972.

Playing career

Early years
Jauron was born in Peoria, Illinois. He attended grammar school in Rensselaer, Indiana. He attended Swampscott High School in Swampscott, Massachusetts, and was a letterman in football, basketball, and baseball. In football, he was a Parade All-American selection as a senior, and was featured in the November 1968 issue of Sport magazine as Teenage Athlete Of The Month. He has been honored as one of the top ten all-time Massachusetts high school football players by the Boston Globe.

College
Jauron rushed for 2,947 yards in three seasons (freshmen were not eligible for the varsity team in the 1970s) at Yale, a record that stood until 2000, and was three times named to the All-Ivy League First-team, the first Yale football athlete to be so honored. His school-record streak of 16 consecutive 100-yard rushing games was not broken until 2006. Jauron was awarded the Nils V. "Swede" Nelson Award for sportsmanship following his junior season and the Bulger Lowe Award, given to the best Division I-A/I-AA player in New England, after his senior season. Jauron recorded the best rushing performance, 183 yards, in The Game his senior season. Yale overcame a 17–0 halftime deficit to defeat Harvard, 28–17.

At Yale Jauron was a three–time All–Ivy First-team selection in an era when freshmen were barred from playing varsity football, and a First-team All America selection during his senior year. He was also a three–time letter winner on Yale's varsity baseball team.

Jauron won the 1972 Asa S. Bushnell Award as Ivy League Player of the Year in football. He is the only athlete to hold a berth in the College Football Hall of Fame, win the Asa S. Bushnell award, and claim selection as a NFF Scholar Athlete. In 1973, Jauron won the William Neely Mallory Award, the most prestigious athletic award given to a senior male at Yale.

Professional
After graduating from college, Jauron was selected in the fourth round of the 1973 NFL Draft by the Detroit Lions. He was also drafted as a shortstop by baseball's St. Louis Cardinals in the 25th round of the 1973 MLB Draft.

Jauron chose the NFL. He started at free safety as a rookie for the Lions. He was named to the 1975 Pro Bowl in his second season after leading the NFC in punt return average. Jauron played with the Lions for five seasons (1973–1977) and the Cincinnati Bengals for three seasons (1978–1980). He finished his playing career with 25 interceptions and two touchdowns.

Coaching career

Early coaching career
Jauron began his coaching career in the NFL in 1985 as the Buffalo Bills defensive backs coach. He was offered the position by Bills defensive coordinator Hank Bullough, who was the Bengals defensive coordinator when Jauron was a player.

After one season with the Bills, Jauron was named the defensive backs coach for the Green Bay Packers. He worked with the team for eight seasons, serving under three different head coaches: Forrest Gregg, Lindy Infante, and Mike Holmgren.

Jauron became the defensive coordinator for the expansion Jacksonville Jaguars in 1995 at the invitation of then-Jaguars head coach Tom Coughlin, whom he coached with at Green Bay. The Jaguars made the playoffs in three of Jauron's four seasons with the team, including an appearance in the 1996 AFC Championship Game.

Following his first head-coaching job, Jauron served as the defensive coordinator for the Detroit Lions in 2004 and the first 11 games of the 2005 season before being named the team's interim head coach.

Chicago Bears
Jauron became the 12th head coach in Chicago Bears history on January 23, 1999, when he was hired to replace Dave Wannstedt, who was fired after two consecutive 4–12 seasons. Jauron coached the Bears for five seasons (1999–2003), finishing with a 35–45 regular season record and one playoff appearance.

In his first two seasons, the Bears finished last in the NFC Central with 6–10 and 5–11 records.

Jauron, however, led the greatest turnaround in team history during his third season. In their 13–3 2001 campaign, Chicago finished 8–0 in games decided by seven points or less, including back-to-back overtime victories. Jauron was named the 2001 AP Coach of the Year and became the third coach in team history to record at least 13 wins in a season, joining George Halas and Mike Ditka, and eventually joined by his successor Lovie Smith. Former Bears head coach Lovie Smith joined that group following the Bears' 13-3 regular season in 2006.

After earning their first division title in 11 years, however, Chicago lost a home game to the Philadelphia Eagles, 33–19, in the NFC Divisional Playoffs. The Bears did not return to the playoffs under Jauron, finishing 4–12 and 7–9 in his last two seasons with the team. He was fired by the Bears after the 2003 season and replaced by Lovie Smith.

Detroit Lions
Jauron was then hired by the Detroit Lions as a defensive coordinator. He was promoted to interim head coach of the Lions on November 28, 2005, after the mid-season firing of Steve Mariucci. Detroit was 4–7 when Jauron took over and won only one of their last five games, finishing the season 5–11. Although Jauron was one of many candidates who interviewed for the head coaching position after the season, he was passed over for Rod Marinelli.

Buffalo Bills
Jauron was named the 14th head coach in Buffalo Bills history on January 23, 2006, following the resignation of Mike Mularkey. He led the Bills to three consecutive 7–9 records, finishing respectively third, second and fourth in the AFC East. In 2008 the team started 5–1, but ended the season on a 2–8 skid.

Bills owner Ralph Wilson announced on December 30, 2008, that Jauron would be brought back for the 2009 season despite the expiration of his three-year contract.

On the morning of Friday, September 4, 2009, Jauron fired his offensive coordinator, Turk Schonert, in a morning meeting before the regular season began. Two different viewpoints emerged, Jauron stating in a press conference the reason for his firing was a "lack of productivity", while Schonert claimed that Jauron told him that he "had too many formations, too many plays", and that he "didn't simplify it to his liking." Schonert was replaced the same day by former Buffalo Bills quarterback and then quarterbacks coach Alex Van Pelt. After taking over, Van Pelt brought back the no-huddle offense, in the form of Jim Kelly's "K-Gun" offense that led the team to four straight Super Bowl appearances in the 1990s.

On November 17, 2009, Jauron was fired by the Bills.

Philadelphia Eagles
On February 2, 2010, Jauron was hired by the Philadelphia Eagles as a senior assistant and defensive backs coach.

Cleveland Browns
On January 21, 2011, Jauron was named defensive coordinator by the Cleveland Browns. He replaced Rob Ryan, who then became defensive coordinator for the Dallas Cowboys. On January 18, 2013, newly hired head coach Rob Chudzinski hired Ray Horton instead of keeping Jauron.

Head coaching record

*Interim head coach

References

External links
 
 

1950 births
Living people
American football running backs
American football safeties
Buffalo Bills coaches
Buffalo Bills head coaches
Chicago Bears head coaches
Cincinnati Bengals players
Detroit Lions coaches
Detroit Lions head coaches
Detroit Lions players
Green Bay Packers coaches
Jacksonville Jaguars coaches
Philadelphia Eagles coaches
National Football League defensive coordinators
Yale Bulldogs baseball players
Yale Bulldogs football players
College Football Hall of Fame inductees
National Conference Pro Bowl players
Sportspeople from Peoria, Illinois
People from Swampscott, Massachusetts
Sportspeople from Essex County, Massachusetts
Coaches of American football from Massachusetts
Players of American football from Massachusetts
Baseball players from Massachusetts